Robert Charles Krueger (September 19, 1935 – April 30, 2022) was an American diplomat, politician, and U.S. Representative and U.S. Senator from Texas, a U.S. Ambassador, and a member of the Democratic Party. , he was the last Democrat to serve as a United States Senator from Texas.

Early life and education
Krueger was born in New Braunfels, Texas, the son of Faye (Leifeste) and Arlon E. Krueger. Krueger earned a B.A. from Southern Methodist University in 1957 and an M.A. from Duke University in 1958. He went to Merton College, Oxford, earning a D.Phil. in English literature with a thesis entitled The poems of William Herbert, Third Earl of Pembroke. He taught English literature as a professor and was later vice provost and Dean of the Trinity College of Arts and Sciences at Duke University. His edition of the poems of Sir John Davies was published by the Clarendon Press, Oxford, in 1975. Krueger held business positions as chairman of the board of Comal Hosiery Mills and managing partner of the Krueger Brangus Ranch before entering elective office.

Career

Politics 
Krueger was elected to the 94th and 95th United States Congresses, serving from January 3, 1975 to January 3, 1979. Krueger was initially elected to the U.S. House of Representatives to represent , then the largest congressional district in Texas, stretching from northern San Antonio to Big Bend National Park in far west Texas. In the general election, Krueger defeated Republican Doug Harlan of San Antonio, who had also run unsuccessfully against the previous congressman from the district O.C. Fisher in 1972. Coincidentally, Harlan like Krueger had obtained a master's degree from Duke University. He then received a law degree from the University of Texas School of Law and became heavily involved in Republican Party consulting work. Krueger was part of the large "Watergate Class" of 1974, many of whom were Democrats who owed their election to the scandal that brought the resignation of President Richard Nixon three months before the election. Krueger was reelected for a second House term in 1976 along with the election of Jimmy Carter as president. Krueger challenged incumbent Republican John Tower in 1978 for a U.S. Senate seat from Texas, but Krueger narrowly lost the contest by 0.3%.

In 1984, he ran again for the U.S. Senate. Tower decided to retire but Krueger lost in the Democratic primary, caught in the middle between the more liberal State Senator Lloyd Doggett and the more conservative U.S. Representative Kent Hance. In 2010, Krueger's campaign was named by the Houston Chronicle as the ninth-worst in Texas' modern political history, saying: "Caught in the middle, Krueger seemed like a bland centrist facing a fiery liberal and a folksy conservative. He ended up finishing third, out of the runoff and out of luck." From 1985 to 1989, he also wrote a regular column on a broad range of public affairs issues, which was carried in newspapers in San Antonio, Dallas, Houston, and Corpus Christi, Texas.

In 1990, Krueger returned to elective office in Texas, serving on the Texas Railroad Commission, which regulated oil and gas as well as the rail system in the state. In his candidacy, Krueger received the most votes of any contested candidate on the primary ballot of either major party and defeated his general election opponent by a 16 percent margin.

He was appointed by Governor Ann Richards in 1993 to the U.S. Senate to fill the vacancy caused by the resignation of four-term incumbent and 1988 Democratic Vice Presidential nominee Lloyd Bentsen, who became Secretary of the Treasury in President Clinton's cabinet. He served from January 21, 1993 until June 14, 1993. He lost the June 1993 special election runoff for the remainder of the term ending January 3, 1995 by a 2-to-1 margin to the popular Texas State Treasurer, Republican Kay Bailey Hutchison. In 2010, Krueger's campaign was named by the same Houston Chronicle article as the single worst in Texas' modern political history. Reasons cited for the defeat included Krueger's flip-flopping over don't ask, don't tell and also Bill Clinton's proposed BTU tax, which was unpopular in Texas.

Diplomacy
On October 23, 1979, Krueger was appointed by President Carter as Ambassador-at-Large and Coordinator for Mexican Affairs at the U.S. Department of State and served the remainder of the Carter presidency until February 1, 1981.

President Bill Clinton named Krueger as Ambassador to Burundi, which had been beset with violence in recent years and whose ethnic make-up was the same as that of adjoining Rwanda, whose Hutu and Tutsi groups had started a bloody civil war only months before Krueger began his service in May 1994. His family was initially not allowed to join him in Burundi due to the threat of violence. He served in Burundi until 1995, when his convoy was ambushed in Cibitoke province. He was traveling on a bare highway in Cibitoke, when gunmen with AK-47s attacked the motorcade, before being diverted by Diplomatic Security Service agents Chris Reilly and Larry Salmon.

In 1996, he was appointed U.S. Ambassador to Botswana and concurrently Special Representative of the Secretary of State to the Southern African Development Community. He held those posts until 2000, when he became a visiting fellow at Merton College, Oxford, and began to write a memoir of his time in central Africa. It was published as From Bloodshed to Hope in Burundi: Our Embassy Years during Genocide by the University of Texas Press in September 2007.

Later work

Krueger served in several academic lectureship positions at the University of North Texas (then known as North Texas State University), the University of Texas at Austin, Rice University, Southern Methodist University, Texas State University, and Texas Tech University, following his service in federal government. He delivered the Inaugural Distinguished Lecture of the Rutgers Council on Public and International Affairs on December 9, 2014.

Personal life
Krueger was married to the former Kathleen Tobin of Bandera, Texas, who co-authored the book From Bloodshed to Hope in Burundi, and served two terms as a City Council Member in New Braunfels, Texas, and as Mayor Pro-tem. The Kruegers have three children. In the late 1980s, Krueger and his family were the victims of a stalker. Their experience led to the passage of a spate of anti-stalking laws in Texas.

Krueger died on April 30, 2022, at the age of 86 from congestive heart failure.

See also
Carl W. A. Groos House

References

Further reading

External links
 

|-

|-

|-

|-

|-

|-

1935 births
2022 deaths
Duke University alumni
Duke University faculty
Ambassadors of the United States to Burundi
Ambassadors of the United States to Botswana
Members of the Railroad Commission of Texas
University of North Texas faculty
Rice University faculty
Southern Methodist University alumni
Democratic Party United States senators from Texas
American people of German descent
People from New Braunfels, Texas
Democratic Party members of the United States House of Representatives from Texas
Alumni of Merton College, Oxford
20th-century American politicians
20th-century American diplomats